Bang Yong-guk (born March 31, 1990), also known mononymously as Yongguk, is a South Korean rapper, singer, songwriter, record producer, and best-selling author who served as the leader of boy group B.A.P up until his departure from TS Entertainment in August 2018.

He made his musical debut in 2008 as a member of an underground hip hop group called Soul Connection under the alias of "Jepp Blackman". In March 2011, he featured on Song Ji-eun's single "Going Crazy", which became a number one hit in South Korea. In July of that year he released his first solo digital single, "I Remember", featuring Beast's Yoseob and in November he promoted in a sub-unit called Bang & Zelo with fellow B.A.P member Zelo, releasing the single "Never Give Up". B.A.P released their first single in January 2012.

Biography
Bang Yong-guk was born in Seoul, South Korea, on March 31, 1990. He is the youngest out of two sons and one daughter in his family. He has an identical twin brother named Yongnam, who has also performed as an underground artist, and an older sister named Natasha.

He moved with his family to the coastal Ijak islands of Incheon when he was young, living there for a short period of time before moving back to mainland Incheon.  He studied at Gae Woong Elementary School and Gae Woong Middle School, and at 18 graduated from Yuhan High School. He was offered a scholarship for college, which he did not attend.

Career

2008–2011: Career beginnings
Bang first began meeting with other members of Soul Connection when he was in his second year of middle school after posting his rap lyrics on an online forum and being recognized for his skill. Through meeting with seniors that were actually active in the music industry, watching them compose and produce, and learning from them, he was able to refine his own techniques and become better at making his style of music

In 2010, Bang was contacted by TS Entertainment to be part of a hip-hop idol group after the duo Untouchable recommended him. Though he was worried that the type of music he could make would be limited, TS Entertainment assured him of being able to live out his dreams. Thus, he joined.

2011: "Going Crazy", "I Remember" and Bang&Zelo
On March 3, 2011, Song Ji-eun's single "Going Crazy" was released, featuring Bang. The single was a commercial and critical success, with fans praising Bang's "husky and fiery delivery".<ref name=nateBYGnewfans>{{cite web|script-title=ko:시크릿 송지은미친거니' 참여 훈남 래퍼는 누구?!|url=http://news.nate.com/view/20110304n10177|publisher=Nate (SK Communications)|access-date=2012-02-08|language=ko}}</ref> It topped the Gaon Music Chart and Gaon Digital and Streaming Chart and gained attention for Bang as an artist; following the single's release, he trended on major portal search sites in South Korea and was requested for multiple broadcast appearances. However, his agency declined these appearances, stating that he was still a trainee and not ready to appear on broadcasts outside of promotional performances. The agency thanked fans for their interest nevertheless.

On August 11, TS Entertainment released Bang's single "I Remember", featuring Yoseob of Beast. The song was a moderate success, peaking in the Top 10 on real time charts in Korea and at #22 on the Gaon Chart. However, the single was deemed unfit for broadcast promotions by KBS because of multiple scenes of shooting and violence.

On December 11, Bang debuted with Zelo as part of the sub-unit rap duo Bang&Zelo with the song "Never Give Up".

2012–2018: B.A.P

Bang was the first member to be announced as part of new TS Entertainment boy group B.A.P, of which he acts as the leader and main rapper. The group released its first single, "Warrior", in January 2012. They held their debut showcase in Seoul with over 3,000 attendees on January 28. The single met with critical acclaim, with media outlets describing the single as "powerful and charismatic".

The following year, Bang performed at the 2013 SBS Gayo Daejeon as part of a collaborative hip-hop stage featuring Tiger JK, Yoon Mirae, and Bizzy and also including Zico, RM and Eun Jiwon.

On November 27, 2014, it was reported that all B.A.P members had filed a lawsuit against their label to nullify their contracts, claiming unfair conditions and profit distribution. The group entered a hiatus

On 4 April 2015 during the hiatus, Bang released a solo song titled "AM 4:44".

On August 1, 2015, it was revealed that B.A.P had reached an agreement with and returned to TS Entertainment. B.A.P made their comeback in November 2015 with the mini-album Matrix, produced and written by Bang.

On October 25, 2016, TS Entertainment revealed that Bang will not be participating in the promotions for B.A.P's upcoming  full-length album, Noir, due to anxiety disorders.

In April 2017, B.A.P began their six city 'Party Baby- U.S. Boom' tour. Bang returned from his hiatus to join the rest of the boys for the single's promotion, "Wake Me Up".

On July 4, 2017, Bang released a solo track titled "Yamazaki". The track featured lyrics in English, Japanese, and Korean. On April 25, 2018, Bang released the official music video of his solo instrumental track "Portrait", co-directed alongside Joe Brown. On May 25, 2018, Bang released the official music video of his solo track titled "Drunkenness." Which features falsetto vocals provided by fellow band-member Yoo Youngjae. He co-directed the music video alongside Joe Brown.

Following the expiration of Bang's contract on August 19, 2018, with TS Entertainment, he decided to leave the company; B.A.P would continue as 5 members until the expiration of all member contracts, after which all members declined to re-sign with TS Entertainment, going their separate ways.

 2018–present: Solo career, enlistment 
Following his departure from TS Entertainment, Bang released the MV for single "Hikikomori", a study of his own anxiety and fears facing both the stage and the world itself, with the title taken from the Japanese slang for 'shut-ins' that refuse to go outside due to various stressors.

On Feb 26, 2019, Bang released "A Short Film About Bang Yongguk]", featuring pre-release track "Journey" to announce his upcoming self-titled solo album. The 13-track album, Bangyongguk, was released March 15, 2019 with lead track "Ya". A MV was filmed for "Ya", but Bang later posted that he had made the decision to "indefinitely postpone" the release due to various factors. Other tracks on "BANG YONGGUK" include re-masters of "AM 4:44" and "Portrait", as well as "Xie Xie" and a remixed version featuring Sway D, Liquor, and rapper LE of girl group EXID.

On June 24, 2019, Bang released photo essay book "The Best Is Yet To Come", a best seller on Korean charts.

Following up, he released single "Orange Drive" as a gift and message to fans prior to his mandatory enlistment period of 2 years.

Bang enlisted in the Korean military as a public service officer on August 1, 2019.

On September 2, 2019, Bang announced through Consent that "Something to Talk About", a documentary he had directed in conjunction with producer Kim Jinbeom, had been selected for screening at the 2019 DMZ International Film Festival. "Something to Talk About" was also nominated under the DMZ Open Cinema category. Covering Bang's experiences as a member of B.A.P as well as his creative process when recording "BANGYONGGUK" and featuring interviews with friends and family, "Something to Talk About" is the first documentary to be produced by an idol.

He officially completed his military service on May 18, 2021.

On September 16, 2021, Bang established his one-man agency Consent.

On November 23, 2021, Bang released the new single "Race". It was his first comeback under his own one-man agency.

On March 2, 2022, Bang released his first EP, 2 and its lead single "Up".

Artistry and influences
Bang is predominantly a hip-hop artist and cites 50 Cent, P. Diddy, and Pharrell as musical influences. Although his goal was not initially to become a K-pop artist, he was influenced by the roles that Supreme Team and Dynamic Duo played in popularizing the genre in South Korea. His voice type has been described as baritone.

Bang also pulls influence from jazz and blues as well as rock/metal and alt-rock.

As well as rapping, Bang also acts as a songwriter and producer for many of B.A.P's songs, including all the tracks from their debut EP Warrior as well as tracks on various albums including Noir, Carnival, and Matrix''. Furthermore, Bang is the lyricist for all B.A.P's songs, and takes influence from his life as well as world events. Bang identifies as a pacifist, and is vocal about his own struggles with mental health as well as his concern for the state of the world. Many of his lyrics openly criticise society, government, companies, and those that take advantage of power or influence to discriminate against others.

Bang drew inspiration for his solo album "BANG YONGGUK" from the contents of his own diary. A deeply personal album, songs on "BANG YONGGUK" range from rage to loss to confrontations on depression and anxiety, to his own loneliness. Track "See You Later" is taken from a draft Will as written in his diary.

Bang is credited on his self-titled album as executive producer, lyricist, track producer, and art director, and self-directs videos for his solo work from conception to editing.

Discography

Digital singles

As a featured artist

Music videos

Filmography

Film

Awards and nominations

References

External links
 
 

1990 births
B.A.P (South Korean band) members
K-pop singers
Living people
Onyang Bang clan
Rappers from Seoul
South Korean male idols
South Korean male rappers
South Korean male singers
South Korean male pop singers
South Korean record producers
South Korean singer-songwriters
South Korean male singer-songwriters
South Korean television personalities
TS Entertainment artists
South Korean baritones
South Korean hip hop record producers
Japanese-language singers of South Korea